The West Point Story (also known as Fine and Dandy) is a 1950 musical comedy film directed by Roy Del Ruth and starring James Cagney, Virginia Mayo and Doris Day.

Plot
Elwin 'Bix' Bixby (James Cagney) is an unemployed Broadway musical director who agrees to stage the annual 100th Night show at West Point . He is offered the job by producer Harry Eberhart (Roland Winters), with whom he has had a rocky relationship over the years. Eberhart has an underhanded goal in mind: He wants to get his talented nephew Tom Fletcher (Gordon MacRae) out of the Corps of Cadets and turn him into a Broadway star. Bix, who is broke or nearly, agrees to arrange this in return for a cut of Fletcher's future earnings.

He and his loyal assistant and girlfriend, Eve Dillon (Virginia Mayo), travel to West Point to turn the annual 100th Night Show written by Tom and his friend  Hal Courtland (Gene Nelson) from amateur hour into a Broadway-level production. Bix quickly runs afoul of the Military Academy's rules and customs, cold-cocking Bull Gilbert (Alan Hale Jr.), the cadet who is playing the Princess in the show, after Bull mouths off during rehearsal. The Commandant of Cadets wants to throw him off the Academy grounds, but the cadets in the 100th Night Show, led by Tom, persuade the Commandant to extend to Bixby a privilege seldom offered to outsiders: to live as one of them, a temporary plebe in the Corps of Cadets. The Com is dubious; he's seen Bixby's wartime record, an equal amount of appalling breaches of discipline (including selling a B-17 to an Arab sheik, and going AWOL from a rest camp to fight the Germans with the French Resistance) and incredible acts of valor that garnered Bix the Distinguished Service Cross, the Silver Star, two Purple Hearts, and the French  Medaille Militaire, a medal seldom awarded to foreigners.

In pursuit of the goal of getting Tom Fletcher out of the Army, Bix persuades his protege Jan Wilson (Doris Day), a chorus girl he discovered and turned into a movie star, to come to a "hop" (dance) thrown by the cast of the 100th Night Show as Tom's date. She finds herself very taken with Cadet Fletcher, and takes on the role of the Princess in the show (courtesy of Bix persuading the Commandant to break tradition and allow a woman to play a female role, West Point at the time being an all-male school; he later persuades the Commandant to allow Eve to play in the show as well). The two of them fall in love, but there are the problems of Tom's military obligation and Jan's Hollywood contracts to be resolved.

Tom goes off the deep end and submits his resignation from the Military Academy. Bix, Bull Gilbert, and Hal, the lead dancer of the 100th Night Show, go AWOL, follow Tom to New York where he has gone to be with Jan, and bring him back to West Point. But before they return to the Academy, Jan says no to Tom's proposal, realizing how important it is to him that he graduate and be commissioned. Tom is devastated.

Wise in the ways of military bureaucracy, Bixby succeeds in intercepting and destroying Tom's resignation letter before official notice can be taken of it, but Tom, Bull, and Hal  are arrested on their return to the Academy by order of the Commandant and are confined to quarters except when on duty or in class. The show is threatened with cancellation.

The cadets in the show and Bix use their influence to arrange a meeting with the French Premier, visiting the United States on a diplomatic mission. Because of a West Point custom that a visiting dignitary can "request amnesty," the forgiving of all disciplinary offenses for the Corps of Cadets, he is the one man in the country who can ensure that the 100th Night Show goes on. Bixby shows the Premier his Medaille Militaire, and the Premier rearranges his schedule to visit the Military Academy, requesting that the Superintendent grant the cadets amnesty at a military parade in his honor.  The Superintendent does so, and the show will go on.

Eberhart comes to West Point to see the show, presuming that he will be bringing his nephew home with him to become a Broadway star. Deciding that her love for Tom is more important than her career, Jan comes north in time to take Bull Gilbert's place as the Princess (much to Bull's relief) for the "Flirtation Rock" number and the two reconcile, with their marriage on graduation implied.

Eberhart, the Broadway producer, comes backstage to find out from Bix when he can take Fletcher back to New York to start his career. When Bixby tells him that Tom is going to become a second lieutenant and not an actor, Eberhart swears that he will see to it Bix never works in show business again. With nothing to lose, Bix  takes a swing at the producer, who ducks. The punch connects with Hal, knocking him out and injuring his leg so he can't go on. Bix goes on with Eve for the specialty dance number "It Could Only Happen In Brooklyn."

Before the Finale, Tom calls Bix out onto the stage and informs him that instead of the book and libretto going into the Academy archives never to be seen again, they are being given to him to turn into a Broadway show. The cadet cast, Bix, Eve, Tom, and Jan then do the Finale, a reprise of the major numbers of the show, and the curtain falls.

Cast
 James Cagney as Elwin 'Bix' Bixby
 Virginia Mayo as Eve Dillon (singing voice was dubbed by Bonnie Lou Williams)
 Doris Day as Jan Wilson
 Gordon MacRae as Tom Fletcher
 Gene Nelson as Hal Courtland
 Alan Hale Jr. as Bull Gilbert
 Roland Winters as Harry Eberhart
 Raymond Roe as Bixby's 'wife' (his West Point roommate and trainer in plebe customs)
 Wilton Graff as Lieutenant Colonel Martin
 Jerome Cowan as Mr. Jocelyn
 James Dobson as a cadet

Musical numbers
 "Hail Alma Mater" - sung by Chorus behind titles
 "It's Raining Sundrops" - sung by Chorus, danced by James Cagney, Virginia Mayo and Chorus in rehearsal
 "One Hundred Days 'Til June" - sung by Gordon MacRae and Chorus
 "By the Kissing Rock" - sung by Gordon MacRae, danced by Gordon MacRae, Alan Hale, Jr. and Chorus
 "By the Kissing Rock" (reprise 1) - sung and danced by James Cagney and Virginia Mayo (dubbed by Bonnie Lou Williams)
 "Long Before I Knew You" - sung by Gordon MacRae, danced by Gene Nelson
 "Long Before I Knew You" - danced by Gene Nelson
 "Ten Thousand Four Hundred Thirty-Two Sheep" - sung by Doris Day and Chorus
 "The Military Polka" - sung and danced by Doris Day, Gordon MacRae, James Cagney, Virginia Mayo (dubbed by Bonnie Lou Williams), Gene Nelson and Chorus
 "You Love Me" - sung by Gordon MacRae
 "By the Kissing Rock" (reprise 2) - sung by Gordon MacRae and Doris Day
 "By the Kissing Rock" (reprise 3) - sung by Virginia Mayo (dubbed by Bonnie Lou Williams)
 "The Corps" - sung by Gordon MacRae and Chorus
 "The Toy Trumpet" - danced by Gene Nelson and Chorus
 "You Love Me" (reprise) - sung by Gordon MacRae and Doris Day
 "B 'Postrophe K No 'Postrophe LYN/It Could Only Happen in Brooklyn" - sung by James Cagney and Chorus, danced by James Cagney, Virginia Mayo and Chorus
 "This Is the Finale"- sung and danced by Doris Day, Gordon MacRae, James Cagney, Virginia Mayo (dubbed by Bonnie Lou Williams), Gene Nelson and Chorus

Reception
The film received two award nominations in 1951. Ray Heindorf was nominated for an Academy Award for Best Music, Scoring of a Musical Picture and John Monks Jr., Charles Hoffman and Irving Wallace were nominated for a Writers Guild of America award for Best Written American Musical.

Box office
According to Warner Bros. records, the film earned $2,146,000 domestically and $744,000 foreign.

References

External links
 
 
 
 

1950 films
1950 musical comedy films
American musical comedy films
American black-and-white films
1950s English-language films
Films directed by Roy Del Ruth
Films scored by Ray Heindorf
Films set in the United States Military Academy
Films with screenplays by Irving Wallace
1950s American films